Abryna copei is a species of beetle in the family Cerambycidae, found in Asia in countries such as Philippines.

References

Beetles described in 2009
Beetles of Asia
Pteropliini